Queen Frederica or Queen Frederika may refer to:

 Frederica Louisa of Hesse-Darmstadt (1751–1805), Queen of Prussia
 Frederica of Mecklenburg-Strelitz (1778–1841), Queen of Hanover
 Frederica of Baden (1781–1826), Queen of Sweden
 Frederica of Hanover (1917–1981), Queen of the Hellenes
 , a Chandris Line cruise ship